The environmental policy of the Joe Biden administration includes a series of laws, regulations, and programs introduced by United States President Joe Biden since he took office in January 2021. Many of the actions taken by the Biden administration reversed the policies of his predecessor, Donald Trump.

By July 2022, the Biden administration had created 54 environmental policies and proposed 43 more.

Biden's climate change policy focuses on reducing greenhouse gas emissions, as under the Obama administration. On his first day in office he rejoined the Paris Agreement. In April 2021, he hosted a virtual climate summit with 40 world leaders. In November 2021, Biden and other world leaders met at the 2021 United Nations Climate Change Conference (COP26) to negotiate goals to reduce global warming. After four years of absence under the former president, the U.S. sought to regain its credibility. The main climate target of the Biden administration is to reduce greenhouse gas emissions by the United States to net zero by 2050. John Kerry leads the effort as Special Envoy for Climate.

On his first day in office, Biden began to make policy changes to protect the environment. He began revising and strengthening the National Environmental Policy Act (NEPA) and ordered a number of executive orders aimed at reviewing or undoing the environmental policies of the former administration, including the protection of wildlife, the construction of the Keystone XL pipeline, and drilling for oil and gas on federal lands.  He promised to end and reverse deforestation and land degradation by 2030. As a first step in recognizing the impact of climate change on less developed nations—an impact which is largely the result of years of environmental damage caused by nations which have prospered—Biden signed an executive order to study the effects of climate change's impact on migration, including "options for protection and resettlement." Biden appointed Pete Buttigieg as the Secretary of Transportation, and he is expected to work with the administration to reduce carbon emissions with plans such as improved public transportation, building a national network of electric vehicle chargers, and other strategies to reduce emissions.

The Biden administration delivered a tax plan to congress that aims to start winding back fossil fuel subsidies, replacing the subsidies with incentives to start producing green energy. His proposed budget includes a 30% increase in clean energy research and development, $2 billion to be invested in green energy projects and $6.5 billion to lend to rural communities in support of additional green energy, power storage, and transmission projects. Biden has ordered the amount of energy produced from offshore wind turbines to be doubled by 2030.

In August 2022, Biden signed into law the Inflation Reduction Act of 2022, which includes the largest federal climate change investment in American history ($391 billion). With this law and additional federal and state measures, the USA can fulfill its pledge in Paris agreement: 50% greenhouse gas emissions reduction by the year 2030.

Local air pollution 

Air pollution in the United States is estimated to kill over 50 thousand people each year, and causes cognitive loss in children. Ultrafine (100 nanometers diameter or less) airborne particles are not regulated, but may also affect brain development, although this is hard to research due to the lack of a national network to monitor ultrafine particles in outdoor air. Over 90% of people in the US are breathing air which does not meet World Health Organisation guidelines. The administration has pledged to reduce pollution in poor minority areas. Non-exhaust emissions from road vehicles, such as fine particles from tire wear, are being researched.

Climate change

The final target of the administration is reaching carbon neutrality in the United States by 2050. Joe Biden sees climate change as an "existential threat", a view supported by most in the scientific community. During his inauguration, Biden said: "A cry for survival comes from the planet itself, a cry that can't be any more desperate or any more clear." However, some activists have criticized the administration's policies for being insufficient to prevent catastrophic climate change. Democratic control of the United States Congress raises the chances that the administration will be able to pass climate-related legislation, although members like Senator Joe Manchin hold key voting positions and could block proposed bills from passing the Senate.

Biden's climate plan changed significantly in 2020. In the beginning, it was criticized by many environmental groups as not being aggressive enough or even being detrimental contrary to prior stances on climate. Biden consulted with them, mainly through the Biden-Sanders Unity Task Forces, and included many of their recommendations in his plans, after which it received more support.

The administration set a target of achieving zero emissions from the power sector by 2035. Other sectors with considerable emissions are agriculture and construction. Biden's climate plan includes a strong increase in green building. According to the plan, 4 million buildings in the United States should be upgraded, as well as 2 million weatherized in the next 4 years. This is expected to create 1 million green jobs. The entire climate plan is expected to create 10 million green jobs. This number is smaller than other proposals like the Green New Deal, which claims to guarantee a job for every American.

Biden ordered the director of national intelligence Avril Haines to prepare a report about the impacts of climate change. Biden also included John Kerry – the Climate Envoy – in the National Security Council. He created a National Climate Task Force and the White House Office of Domestic Climate Policy. He said: "In my view, we've already waited too long to deal with this climate crisis and we can't wait any longer. We see it with our own eyes, we feel it, we know it in our bones." and "it's time to act". He also mentioned that climate action is linked with other aspects of his agenda such as health, jobs, and security.

As of August 2021, some calculations suppose that the infrastructure bill, the budget reconciliation bill, if passed, will cut emissions by 45% by 2030. Administrative orders from Biden and some states should increase the reduction to 50%.

In September 2021, the EPA planned to issue its final rule to reduce hydrofluorocarbon (HFC) emissions by 85% within 15 years.

In December 2021, Biden signed an executive order directing the US government to cut its own emission by 65% by 2030 with different measures including energy efficiency, electric vehicles and renewable energy.

Social cost of carbon 

On the first day of his presidency, Biden signed an order directing a return to the Obama-era policy of taking into account the social cost of carbon when implementing new regulations, a practice that the Trump administration abandoned in 2017. In February 2021, Biden raised the social cost of carbon in the US to $51 per ton, replacing the lower Trump Administration's estimates with the estimates developed under President Obama. This figure has an impact on EPA regulations but not on the fuel price. Carbon pricing is already in operation in a few US states. The $51 estimate is announced to be evaluated. It is lower than the EU carbon price but higher than the Chinese carbon price.  The administration has set the social cost of methane at $1,500 per tonne.

In March 2022, the court allowed the Biden administration to use the social cost of carbon, reversing a previous court ruling.

Climate legislation 
In the years 2021-2022 Biden promoted 2 bills that can reduce the US greenhouse gas emissions by more than 50% from the level of 2005: the Infrastructure Investment and Jobs Act and the Build Back Better Act. The Build Back Better act faced strong opposition in the Senate and was not approved. The group of experts who made the analysis said that the Infrastructure Investment and Jobs Act alone will make only a small reduction in emissions, but they did not count at all the impact of measures regarding highways and public transport. The bill includes the largest federal investment in public transit in history. The bill includes spending of 105 billion dollars in public transport. It also give 110 billion on fixing roads and bridges what includes measures for climate change mitigation - access for cyclists and pedestrians.

The Infrastructure Investment and Jobs Act, was approved by the Congress and signed by Biden into law in November 2021.

In August 2022, President Biden signed into law the Inflation Reduction Act, which contains the largest climate investment by the U.S. federal government in history, including over $391 billion to reduce carbon emissions. The bill, passing by a 51-50 vote in the Senate, explicitly defined carbon dioxide as an air pollutant under the Clean Air Act to make the Act's EPA enforcement provisions harder to challenge in court. With this law approved and additional federal and state measures, the USA can fulfill its pledge in Paris agreement: 50% greenhouse gas emissions reduction by the year 2030.

Infrastructure Investment and Jobs Act 

Biden's infrastructure plan is also a major pillar in his climate policy. The plan includes measures for reaching carbon neutrality in the electricity sector, supporting electric vehicles, and promoting energy efficiency on a very large scale. The plan should cost $2.3trillion. If passed, it can have a large influence on the Greenhouse gas emissions of the United States. The plan, according to Biden's administration, should help rebuild the American economy and create millions of jobs. Biden's administration claims that economic and climate issues are linked.

In June 2021 Biden and a group of democratic and republican senators agreed on a compromise; a $973 billion bill. According to an official press release "The Plan is the largest federal investment in public transit in history and is the largest federal investment in passenger rail since the creation of Amtrak." According to the document this should lower the GHG emission of the US.

On 10 of August the bill was approved by the Senate. 19 Republican senators, including Mitch McConnell, voted for it, despite criticism from Donald Trump, who called it "the beginning of the Green New Deal". The bill includes spending of 105 billion dollars for public transit, $21 billion for environmental projects, $50 billion for water storage, $15 billion for electric vehicles. 73 billion dollars will be spent on power infrastructure what includes its adjustment to renewable energy. $110 billion will be spent on fixing roads and bridges what includes measures for climate change mitigation - access for cyclists and pedestrians. The plan also includes $1 billion for better connection of neighborhoods separated by transport infrastructure. According to Biden's administration the plan should add 2 million jobs per year.

Build Back Better Act 
A potential $23 billion worth of tax credits for nuclear generating plants are included in the proposed bill while the Infrastructure Investment and Jobs Act which became law included modest amounts to support older plants and DOE's Advanced Reactor Demonstration Program (ADRP).

Inflation Reduction Act 

The law is considered as the most important climate legislation in the history of the USA. It is expected to also make some impact internationally, repositioning the country as climate leader. It represents the largest investment into addressing climate change in United States history, including more than $391 billion to reduce carbon emissions. According to several independent analyses, the law is projected to reduce 2030 U.S. greenhouse gas emissions to 40% below 2005 levels.

The bill aims to decrease residential energy costs by focusing on improvements to home energy efficiency. Measures include $9 billion in home energy rebate programs that focus on improving access to energy efficient technologies, and 10 years of consumer tax credits for the use of heat pumps, rooftop solar, and high-efficiency electric heating, ventilation, air conditioning and water heating. The bill extends the $7,500 tax credit for the purchase of new electric vehicles while also providing a $4,000 tax credit toward the purchase of used electric vehicles, in an effort to increase low- and middle-income access to this technology. This is projected to lead to an average of $500 in savings on energy spending for every family that receives the maximal benefit of these incentives.

The bill includes a 30% tax credit ($1,200 to $2,000 per year) and different types of rebates (reaching $14,000) for homeowners who will increase the energy efficiency of their house. In some cases, all upgrade expenses will be returned.

The bill allocates $3 billion for helping disadvantaged communities with transportation matters, including reconnecting communities separated by transport infrastructure, assuring safe and affordable transportation "and community engagement activities." This should improve clean transit. Projects improving connectivity and walkability in these neighborhoods can get grants reaching 80%-100% of the overall cost. The bill also supports biking.

There are also funds allocated to national clean energy production. This includes the continuation of the production tax credit ($30 billion) and investment tax credit ($10 billion) toward clean energy manufacturing, including solar power, wind power, and energy storage.

The bill also provides funds toward the decarbonization of the economy in other areas, providing various tax credits and grants toward decarbonizing the industrial and transportation sectors. This also includes a program to reduce methane emissions from production and transportation of natural gas. The bill also provides for a focus on communities and environmental justice by providing several grants targeting historically marginalized and disadvantaged communities that have been disproportionally impacted by environmental pollution and climate change.

The bill also allocates funds for rural communities and forestland, including $20 billion to invest in climate-smart agriculture, $5 billion in forest conservation and urban tree planting and $2.6 billion to protect and restore coastal habitats.

The bill should cut the global greenhouse gas emissions in a level similar to "eliminating the annual planet-warming pollution of France and Germany combined" and may help to limit the warming of the planet to 1.5 degrees - the target of the Paris Agreement. With the bill and additional federal and state measures, the USA can fulfill its pledge in Paris agreement: 50% greenhouse gas emissions reduction by the year 2030.

An assessment by the Rhodium Group, an independent research firm, estimated it would reduce national greenhouse gas emissions 32–42% below 2005 levels by 2030, compared to 24–35% under current policy while reducing household energy costs and improving energy security. Furthermore, Rhodium Group projects that the nuclear provisions in the bill are likely to "keep much, if not all" of the nation's nuclear reactors that are at risk of retiring, estimated to be 22–38% of the fleet, online through the 2030s.

A preliminary analysis by the REPEAT Project of Princeton University estimated that the investments made by the law would reduce net emissions 42% below 2005 levels, compared to 27% under current policies (including the Bipartisan Infrastructure Law).

The nonpartisan Energy Innovation Group estimated the reduction of greenhouse gas emissions at 37–41% below 2005 levels in 2030, compared to 24% without the bill. This estimate of the greenhouse gas emission reduction lines up with the figure provided by the bill's authors which is a 40% reduction in carbon emissions relative to 2005 levels.

Modeling from the nonpartisan research institution Resources for the Future indicates the bill would decrease retail power costs by 5.2–6.7% over a ten-year period, resulting in savings of $170–220 per year for the average U.S. household. Also that the bill would tend to stabilize electricity prices.

In reaction to the Supreme Court case West Virginia v. EPA, which limited the EPA's authority to institute a program such as the Obama-era Clean Power Plan, the IRA also includes language granting the EPA more authority to regulate carbon dioxide and other greenhouse gases, as well as to promote renewable energy.

Adaptation to climate change 
Biden's administration spent a lot of effort on flood management and increasing climate resilience as a whole especially in communities discriminated before.

Climate team 
The following officials compose Joe Biden's climate team:

Domestic action 
In May 2022 the White House Council on Environmental Quality released a report in which it describes how Biden's administration followed the around 200 recommendations of the White House Environmental Justice Advisory Council. The full report has around 150 pages. The report summarizes many of the steps taken by the administration in the environmental domain. Among others, it mentions:
 Unprecedented funding for Energy efficiency and Weatherization.
 Promoting Transit-oriented development, Walking, Cycling, Mixed-use development.
 Promoting cooperation with Indigenous peoples of the Americas in environmental issues.

Climate change adaptation and risk management

In December 2021, Intercontinental Exchange acquired risQ, a geospatial and climate data modeling start-up company, after announcing partnerships with the company to develop climate risk and ESG analytics models for municipal bond markets in January 2020 and mortgage-backed securities markets in March 2021. In March 2022, the U.S. Securities and Exchange Commission (SEC) approved a rule proposal to require the disclosure of stock corporation climate risks in 10-K forms. In January 2023, the Federal Reserve announced that the six largest U.S. banks (Bank of America, Citigroup, Goldman Sachs, JPMorgan Chase, Morgan Stanley, and Wells Fargo) would have until the following July 31 to complete a pilot climate scenario exercise analysis of climate risks to their loan portfolios and commercial real estate holdings in the Northeastern United States.

Greenwashing, ESG, and non-state carbon neutrality 

On January 28, 2021, Microsoft disclosed an investment in Climeworks, a direct air capture company partnered with Carbfix for carbon sequestration, one year after the company announced a strategy to take the company carbon negative by 2030 and to remove all the carbon from the environment the company has emitted since 1975 by 2050. In January 2023, Climeworks announced that it had successfully sequestered carbon dioxide underground permanently on a carbon credit contract that was verified by DNV. In January 2019, the Coca-Cola Hellenic Bottling Company (partially-owned by The Coca-Cola Company) announced that its carbonated water brand Valser would use captured carbon from Climeworks, and in 2021, a Coca-Cola HBC official stated in an interview with The Wall Street Journal that 30 percent of their production was done with captured carbon from Climeworks. In 2021 and 2022, an index constructed by researchers at the University of Cambridge showed that bitcoin mining consumed more electricity during the course of the year than the entire nations of Argentina (a G20 country) and the Netherlands.

On February 8, 2021, Tesla, Inc. disclosed to the SEC that it purchased $1.5 billion worth of bitcoin. On February 12, the Biden administration announced that it would steer $30 billion in farm aid from the Commodity Credit Corporation to farmers implementing regenerative farming practices to enhance biosequestration. On March 10, the Employee Benefits Security Administration (EBSA) of the U.S. Labor Department announced that it would review and not enforce a Trump administration final rule for fiduciaries in proxy voting under the Employee Retirement Income Security Act of 1974 (ERISA) to consider pecuniary interests only and not environmental, social, and corporate governance (ESG) factors in investments for 401(k)s pursuant to Executive Order 13990. On April 15, Apple Inc. announced the creation of a $200 million forestry fund as part of the company's strategy to become carbon neutral by 2030. On October 14, EBSA proposed reversing the Trump administration ERISA final rule for fiduciaries in proxy voting on ESG investments for 401(k)s.

On February 7, 2022, the NewClimate Institute, a German environmental policy think tank, published a survey evaluating the transparency and progress of the climate strategies and carbon neutrality pledges announced by 25 major companies in the United States that found that the climate pledges of Alphabet Inc., Amazon.com, Inc., and Apple were unsubstantiated and misleading. On June 23, 2020, Amazon announced a $2 billion venture fund to invest in startup companies developing strategies to reduce greenhouse gas emissions as part of a strategy to be a carbon neutral company by 2040, after announcing a $10 million investment to two projects in the Appalachian Mountains the previous April to manage their lands to maximize greater carbon removal, the first investment from a $100 million initiative to support reforestation and habitat restoration. On June 30, 2021, Amazon released its annual company sustainability report that showed that company net carbon emissions grew by 19 percent from 2019 to 2020.

On February 11, 2022, Western Louisiana U.S. District Court Judge James D. Cain Jr. issued a preliminary injunction in Louisiana v. Biden (2022) in favor of the plaintiffs to block federal agency requirements to assess the societal costs of greenhouse gas emissions in regulatory actions under Executive Order 13990. On March 16, the U.S. 5th Circuit Court of Appeals stayed the decision following an appeal by the U.S. Justice Department, and on May 26, the U.S. Supreme Court issued an order without comment or opposition dismissing an appeal filed by the plaintiffs to reverse the 5th Circuit Court of Appeals decision. On February 15, 2022, ConocoPhillips announced a pilot program to sell its flare gas to a company operating a bitcoin mine in the Bakken Formation region of North Dakota as part of a company initiative to reduce routine flaring to zero by 2030.

On March 17, Target Corporation converted its store in Vista, California to an all-renewable energy facility by adding solar carports to the parking lot as a company pilot for the entire chain. On March 21, the U.S. Securities and Exchange Commission (SEC) approved a rule proposal to require the disclosure of stock corporation net contribution to greenhouse gas emissions in 10-K forms. On March 26, CNBC reported that ExxonMobil started a pilot program in January 2021 with Crusoe Energy Systems to also divert its flare gas into generators producing electricity to power shipping containers full of bitcoin miners in the North Dakota Bakken region (which it expanded the following July) as part of the same industry initiative with ConocoPhillips, and that Crusoe has stated reduces carbon dioxide equivalent emissions by 63 percent as compared with continued flaring.

On April 4, the Intergovernmental Panel on Climate Change (IPCC) released the study of its third working group for the panel's Sixth Assessment Report that stated "All global pathways that limit warming to 1.5 °C … with no or limited overshoot, and those that limit warming to 2 °C… involve rapid and deep and in most cases immediate GHG emission reductions in all sectors. Modelled mitigation strategies to achieve these reductions include transitioning from fossil fuels without CCS to very low- or zero-carbon energy sources, such as renewables or fossil fuels with CCS, demand side measures and improving efficiency, reducing non-CO emissions, and deploying carbon dioxide removal (CDR) methods to counterbalance residual GHG emissions", reiterating the finding of the IPCC Special Report on Global Warming of 1.5 °C released in October 2018 that stated "All pathways that limit global warming to 1.5 °C with limited or no overshoot project the use of carbon dioxide removal (CDR) on the order of 100–1000 GtCO over the 21st century. CDR would be used to compensate for residual emissions and, in most cases, achieve net negative emissions to return global warming to 1.5 °C…". On April 12, Alphabet, Meta Platforms, Shopify, McKinsey & Company, and Stripe, Inc. announced a $925 million advance market commitment of permanent carbon removal from companies that are developing the technology over the next 9 years.

On May 19, after Tesla, Inc. was removed from the S&P 500 ESG Index by S&P Dow Jones Indices, Tesla CEO Elon Musk posted a tweet to his Twitter account criticizing the decision and, in noting that ExxonMobil was rated within the top 10 constituent companies in the index by weight, accused ESG of being a scam. On the same day, the U.S. Department of Energy announced a $3.5 billion program funded under the Infrastructure Investment and Jobs Act to create four large-scale regional direct air capture hubs each consisting of a network of carbon dioxide removal projects. On May 25, the SEC proposed two rules changes to ESG investment fund qualifications to prevent greenwashing marketing practices and to increase disclosure requirements for achieving ESG impacts. Also in May 2022, Toyota, JetBlue, and Parley for the Oceans were among the corporate investors that have invested $40 million in the Air Company, a carbon negative vodka distiller and perfume and hand sanitizer manufacturer that uses heterogeneous catalysis to convert captured carbon into ethanol. On June 10, the SEC was reportedly investigating the ESG investment funds of Goldman Sachs for potential greenwashing.

After noting that his company had launched a division to commercialize carbon capture in testimony before the U.S. House Oversight and Reform Committee on October 28, 2021, ExxonMobil CEO Darren Woods discussed in an interview with CNBC journalist David Faber on June 24 that part of ExxonMobil's long-term strategy to remain a profitable company while reducing greenhouse gas emissions and plastic pollution was to invest in carbon capture and storage technology with a network hub in Houston and to remain a plastics producer while making improvements to waste management. In May 2021, ExxonMobil topped the Plastic Waste Makers Index report published by the Minderoo Foundation of 20 petrochemical companies that manufactured 55 percent of the single-use plastic waste in the world in 2019 (which were part of a larger group of 100 petrochemical companies that manufactured 90 percent of the waste), while in April 2022, California Attorney General Rob Bonta issued a subpoena to ExxonMobil for information related to the company's role in overstating the effectiveness of plastic recycling in reducing plastic pollution as part of an industry campaign to promote plastic usage.

On the same day, the New York State Department of Environmental Conservation denied a request for an air permit for a natural gas power plant owned by Greenidge Generation, a bitcoin mining company, on Seneca Lake used for powering an 8,000-machine operation which the company argued had no legal basis and would challenge in court in a press statement. In August 2022, craft beer brewers in the Greater Boston area were experiencing a carbon dioxide supply chain disruption for carbonation in their beverages. In October 2022, the Global CCS Institute released a report on the global status of carbon capture and sequestration (CCS) projects that stated that 61 new CCS projects had been announced over the previous year and that 196 projects were operational or in development worldwide in total (the largest of which is the $2.6 billion Northern Lights project being constructed by Shell plc, TotalEnergies, and Equinor that will be completed in 2024).

On November 8, the High-Level Expert Group on the Net Zero Emissions Commitments of Non-State Entities of the United Nations formed the previous March by U.N. Secretary-General António Guterres and chaired by former Canadian Minister of Environment and Climate Change Catherine McKenna released a report at the 2022 United Nations Climate Change Conference (COP27) that stated that the carbon neutrality pledges of many corporations, local governments, regional governments, and financial institutions around the world often amount to nothing more than greenwashing and provided 10 recommendations to ensure greater credibility and accountability for carbon neutrality pledges such as requiring non-state actors to publicly disclose and report verifiable information that substantiates compliance with such pledges. On November 11, Biden announced new EPA rules for methane emissions reductions by oil and gas companies in the United States at COP27 from routine flaring and leaks at natural gas production facilities.

On November 15, a research consortium called the Net Zero Tracker that includes the NewClimate Institute, the Energy and Climate Intelligence Unit, the Data-Driven EnviroLab of the University of North Carolina at Chapel Hill, and the Net Zero Initiative at the University of Oxford issued a report evaluating the climate neutrality pledges of 116 of 713 regional governments, of 241 of 1,177 cities with populations greater than 500,000, and of 1,156 of 2,000 publicly-listed companies in the 25 countries with the greatest emissions (whose pledges cover more than 90% of the gross world product) by the recommendations of the UN report and found that many these pledges were largely unsubstantiated and more than half of cities have no plan for tracking and reporting compliance with pledges. On November 22, Goldman Sachs agreed to pay $4 million to settle the SEC investigation of the company's ESG funds for greenwashing without admitting or denying guilt of the SEC's allegations. On the same day, EBSA announced a final rule removing the Trump administration pecuniary interest only requirement for fiduciaries in proxy voting under ERISA when considering ESG investments for 401(k)s.

On December 9, House Oversight and Reform Committee Chairwoman Carolyn Maloney and House Oversight Environment Subcommittee Chairman Ro Khanna sent a memorandum to all House Oversight and Reform Committee members summarizing additional findings from the Committee's investigation into the fossil fuel industry disinformation campaign to obscure the role of fossil fuels in causing global warming, and that upon reviewing internal company documents, accused BP, Chevron, ExxonMobil, and Shell of greenwashing their Paris Agreement carbon neutrality pledges while continuing long-term investment in fossil fuel production and sales, for engaging in a campaign to promote the use of natural gas as a clean energy source and bridge fuel to renewable energy, and of intimidating journalists reporting about the companies' climate actions and of obstructing the Committee's investigation, which ExxonMobil, Shell, and the American Petroleum Institute denied. On December 14, the Federal Trade Commission announced that it was seeking public comment until February 21, 2023 for potential revisions to agency guidelines made pursuant to Section 5 of the Federal Trade Commission Act of 1914 for preventing deceptive green marketing practices. In January 2023, the American Clean Power Association released an annual industry report that found that 326 corporations had contracted 77.4 gigawatts of wind or solar energy by the end of 2022 and that the three largest purchasers were Amazon, Meta Platforms, and Alphabet.

Energy efficiency 
The executive order requiring federal agencies to cut emissions issued on 8 December 2021 contained measures about energy efficiency (sections 205, 206, 605).

By the end of the year 2021, the Joe Biden administration reversed some of the rules established under Trump that reduced energy efficiency, but many of them remained in place.

The administration released unprecedented funding for energy efficiency and weatherization. The Weatherization Assistance Program alone gave 3.5 billion dollars for the effort, resulting in 700,000 low-income households that increased energy efficiency and paid less for energy. 8.7 billion dollars were spent through the Low-Income Home Energy Assistance Program (LIHEAP). This program primarily helped households with children, elderly individuals, and people with disabilities.

In June 2022, Biden announced a new initiative for increasing energy efficiency in buildings, reducing payment for energy in households at the same time. At least 225 million dollars were scheduled to be spent on it.

In February 2023 the United States Department of Energy proposed a set of new energy efficiency standards that, if implemented, will save to users of different electric machines in the United States around 3,500,000,000$ per year and will reduce by the year 2050 carbon emissions by the same amount as emitted by 29,000,000 houses.

Oil and gas pipelines 

The Biden administration supports the Line 3 pipeline owned by the Canadian corporation Enbridge. However, the pipeline was still facing significant resistance as of September 2021.

In January 2021, President Biden halted further development of the Keystone Pipeline by way of an executive order, which also directed agencies to review and reverse more than 100 Trump administration actions on the environment.  In June 2021, the pipeline project was canceled. It was considered an environmental threat by environmentalists, indigenous peoples, and the Biden administration.

Environmental reviews of projects 
In January 2021, Biden took some actions to improve the link between science and the policies of his administration on environmental issues. It includes improving the environmental reviews of big projects before they are given approval according to the NEPA, improving the function of the Environmental Protection Agency, and reestablishing a scientific body to calculate the social cost of all greenhouse gases, not just carbon dioxide. He ordered a stop to the oil and gas drilling in the Arctic National Wildlife Refuge, as well as stating that the voices of indigenous peoples should be taken into consideration in the process of approving projects. He has also begun the process of installing standards for methane emissions.

In October 2021, the Biden administration filed an application for a "mineral withdrawal" which will put a hold on the development of a copper mine near Ely, Minnesota while the environmental impacts are studied. The proposed mine is located on the watershed of the Boundary Waters Canoe Area Wilderness,  an area that is popular for canoeing, fishing, and hiking, and is the country's most visited wilderness area. The Obama administration had launched a similar study but 24 weeks into the 28 week study the newly elected Trump administration ended it, allowing the plans for the mining operation to continue. The completed study could lead to a 20-year ban on mining upstream from the BWCAW.

In April 2022, the Biden administration restored an environmental law from the 1970s abolished by Trump, requiring consideration of climate impacts and local community interests before approving major projects.

Drilling on public lands 
One week after becoming president, Biden signed several executive orders aimed at combatting climate change and protecting the environment. He ordered the Interior Secretary to stop new oil and gas drilling in federal lands and water, and a review of existing projects. However, these pauses were only temporary and didn't stop drilling permanently. Another order sets a target of protecting 30% of United States lands and waters by 2030, as well as set in motion the creation of a plan for climate financing and a climate target for the United States. Biden also signed a presidential memorandum establishing a process for documenting any instances in which "improper political interference" interfered with research or distorted data.  Biden also increased the social cost of carbon to $51, the price that had been set by the Obama administration but had been slashed to $7 by Trump.

In response to the reviews, the Interior Department stopped many of the oil and gas drilling projects, took measures for the protection of wild animals, and restored national monuments. It is also preparing a review of the entire oil and gas leasing program of the United States. However, the Biden administration does support an oil drilling project, known as "Willow", which was approved by the Trump administration. This decision was criticized by environmentalists.

In early June 2021, the Interior Department suspended all oil and gas leases in the Arctic National Wildlife Refuge. This national wildlife refuge includes around 20 million acres where snowy owls, caribou and other endangered wildlife lives. Days later, a federal court issued a temporary injunction against the Interior Department action, pending litigation filed by more than a dozen states.

In October 2021, Biden announced the expansion of Bears Ears, the Grand Staircase–Escalante, and Northeast Canyons and Seamounts Marine.

Attorneys general from Republican states successfully sued to lift the suspension that Biden had placed on the selling of federal gas and oil leases and on September 17 energy companies including Chevron, ExxonMobil, and Shell bid $192 million for drilling rights on federal gas and oil reserves in the Gulf of Mexico. In November 2021, it was reported that the Biden administration was preparing lease some 80 million acres to gas and oil drilling companies. More than 250 indigenous, social justice, and environmental groups wrote a letter to the Biden administration asking Biden to keep his promise to end new leases on public waters and lands and stop the sale which they believe "makes a mockery" of the climate commitments made at COP26. The lease sale in the Gulf of Mexico was further criticized after the Department of Justice debunked the justification that the sale was legally required by the June 2021 ruling blocking the pause on oil leases.

In January 2022, a federal judge remanded the lease auction back to the Bureau of Ocean Energy Management for relying on a distorted Trump-era environmental impact assessment. The administration also proposed another round of gas and oil lease sales in 2022, in Colorado, Montana, Wyoming, and other western states.

In February 2022, the Biden administration suspended any further oil and gas leases on public lands. The decision came after a Trump-appointed judge reversed the social cost of carbon of $51 per ton, the figure established by Obama and restored by Biden, back to $7 per ton which had been Trump's cost estimate.  The reversal was a result of a suit by 10 Republican attorneys general.

In May 2022 the administration abolished 3 leases in the Mexican Gulf and Alaska. One of the reasons was "a lack of industry interest".

Renewable energy 
In his proposed 2022 budget, the Biden Administration has proposed a $10 billion investment in clean energy research and development, an increase of 30%. The budget also proposes $2 billion to be invested in green energy projects, as well as setting aside reserves of $6.5 billion to lend to communities to lend to rural communities in support of additional green energy, power storage, and transmission projects. Biden has ordered the amount of energy produced from offshore wind turbines to be doubled by 2030.

Nuclear energy 
$6.6 billion is provided in the new infrastructure law to keep older nuclear power plants from being prematurely decommissioned. Biden initiatives fully fund two new reactor demonstration projects, X-energy and TerraPower.

Fossil fuel subsidies 
The Biden administration has delivered a tax plan to congress that aims to start winding back fossil fuel subsidies, replacing the subsidies with incentives to start producing green energy. It is estimated that ending tax subsidies for those companies could save the American taxpayer $121 billion over the course of the next decade. He has also stated his ambition to make the United States' power sector completely free of fossil fuels by 2035, and will bring a law to congress with a legal commitment to make the grid 80% clean by 2030. He has also made a commitment to ensure that all federal vehicles are electric. In a series of executive orders at the beginning of his presidency, Biden ordered an increase in the production of renewable energy on federal lands and water, the creation of the Civilian Climate Corps, and making the fossil fuel companies responsible for repairing faults that lead to environmental damage. As a part of a commitment to environmental justice, he also stated that 40% of all climate investments will be sent to the most historically vulnerable communities, and created a special body for dealing with the issue, the White House Environmental Justice Interagency Council.

Deforestation 

In November 2021, Biden promised to end and reverse deforestation and land degradation by 2030, in the COP26 climate summit's first major agreement.

Wildlife 

On the first day of his presidency, the Biden administration ordered a broad review of Trump-era policies pertaining to wildlife in the United States, including the gutting of the Migratory Birds Treaty Act and his decision to strip a number of animals, including gray wolves and the northern spotted owl, of their protections under the Endangered Species Act.  In June 2021, the Biden administration announced that they were beginning the process of restoring and strengthening wildlife protections that were loosened under the Trump Administration, mainly in regards to the weakening of protections granted to endangered animals under the Endangered Species Act, and the extent to which their habitats have to be protected. In June 2022, the Biden administration restored a rule that broadened the definition of a “critical habitat” and allowed more protection of endangered species. This reversed a rule that Trump put into place right before leaving office, which limited the definition of a “critical habitat” to areas that could have sustained endangered species at the time, excluding places that could potentially sustain them in the future.

Biden's administration set a goal of protecting 30% of the land and the water of the US. Currently, 12% of land and 26% of water are protected. The plan for achieving the target is called "America the beautiful" and include many measures like expanding urban green spaces, collaboration with indigenous people and more. Some of the measures have been already in place as of June 2021. Nevertheless, because it requires 67 votes in the Senate it can be blocked by Republicans; the US remains the only UN member state which has not ratified the Convention on Biological Diversity.

Transportation 
The transportation sector is the biggest emitter of CO2 in the United States, and reducing transportation emissions will require a large-scale transition to carbon-free transportation. Biden promised to give all cities with populations greater than 100,000 people good public transport with low carbon options. United States Secretary of Transportation Pete Buttigieg is expected to work toward achieving the goals, but nothing had been put into action as of June 2021. Biden plans to increase the use of "zero carbon" transport, including cycling and walking.

In August 2021, the EPA proposed new light-duty vehicle greenhouse gas emission standards for Model Years 2023 through 2026. The 2023  target would call for a 9.8% reduction over the 2022  target with subsequent year-over-year reductions of approximately 5%.

In December 2021, the new greenhouse gas emissions standards for vehicles were adopted. They were 6% stronger than the original proposition made in August and were estimated to prevent the emission of 3.1 billion tons of  into the atmosphere. The benefits of the new standards overpass the cost by 190 billion dollars, including savings on fuel, reduction of the impacts of climate change and air pollution. According to the EPA the reduction is "equivalent to more than half the total U.S.  emissions in 2019". The rules should cut the emissions from passenger cars and trucks (17% of the US greenhouse gas emissions) by 5%-10% in the years 2023–2026.

The Infrastructure Investment and Jobs Act includes:
 $7.5 billion to build a national network of electric vehicle chargers
 $5 billion for a "Clean School Bus Program"
 $350 million for new wildlife crossings and corridors pilot project
 $250 million for an electric or low-emissions ferry pilot program
 $250 million to reduce truck idling at ports

Biden's administration promoted Transit-oriented development, Walking, Cycling, Mixed-use development among other by creating community-based Transport hubs. This was done mainly in low income neighborhoods. 1 billion dollars will be spent on reconnecting neighborhoods.

Climate migration
The changes being considered could far surpass current international practices, with some experts  saying it could potentially vault the United States to global climate leadership after four years in which President Trump  dismantled  the United States' capacity for both climate action and refugee resettlement.

Agriculture 
Biden pledged to cut emissions from the agriculture sector in the US by 50% by 2030. In February 2022 the United States Department of Agriculture begun to implement a program designed to cut greenhouse gas emissions from the agricultural sector in the US. The sector accounts for over 10% of the overall emissions. The program includes a 1 billion dollars spendings on methods like No-till farming, Crop rotation, Carbon capture and storage, Manure management and Rotational grazing. The program includes measures regarding Forests. The agriculture sector in the USA has already heavily suffered from different impacts of climate change.

Indigenous people 
The administration spent many efforts on enhancing cooperation with the Indigenous peoples of the Americas, among others, by creating a consultation mechanism for assuring their voice will be heard. Different tribes and villages received help in protection from different effects of climate change.

International action

Paris climate agreement 

Upon his first hours in office on January 20, 2021, President Biden signed an executive order bringing the United States back into the Paris Climate Agreement, after President Trump announced the country's withdrawal in 2017. The move was welcomed by environmental groups and by the Union of Concerned Scientists.

The General Secretary of the United Nations, António Guterres, congratulated Biden, stating that with the United States rejoining the agreement, the countries responsible for two-thirds of the global greenhouse gas emission will have made pledges to become carbon neutral. Without the United States, it was only half. President of France Emmanuel Macron congratulated Biden saying, 'Welcome back to the Paris Agreement!'

In February 2021, The United States officially rejoined the Paris Agreement. Speaking about the occasion, John Kerry mentioned the urgent need to act on climate change in the next 10 years, the impact that climate change will have on the future, and the impacts that it is already having, such as the latest extreme cold events in the USA that in his opinion is "related to climate because the polar vortex penetrates further south because of the weakening of the jet stream related to warming." This opinion is shared by many climate scientists.

One week after Biden became president, he also began the process of creating a special plan for providing financial help for low-income countries in addressing issues related to climate change mitigation and climate change adaptation.

In February 2021, Biden issued an order to begin the process of identification of climate refugees and finding ways to help those people.

The Biden administration is urging China to speed up its commitment to becoming carbon neutral, with John Kerry saying that its pledge to reach net-zero emissions by 2060 is "not good enough".

International climate summit 

On the 22–23 April 2021, Biden hosted a virtual climate summit with 40 world leaders, organised by the administration.

At the summit, Biden announced a new target for the US, previously having no Nationally Determined Contribution due to their withdrawal from the Paris Agreement. The new target aims to reduce GHG emissions by 50% - 52% by 2030 relative to the level of 2005, the amount specified by experts to adequately limit temperature rise. The new target is described as a considerable step forward in the fight against climate change, although still not enough to limit global temperature rise to under the 1.5 degrees target. Overall, the commitments made at the summit reduce the gap between the government's current pledges and the 1.5 degrees target by 12% - 14%. If the pledges are accomplished, global emissions by 2030 will fall by 2.6% - 3.7% Gte more than they would have with the pledges before the summit.

At the beginning of May 2021, Climate Action Tracker released a more detailed report about the significance of the summit. According to the report, the summit, together with other pledges made from September 2020, reduce the expected rise in temperature by 2100 by 0.2 degrees. If all pledges are fulfilled, temperatures will rise by 2.4 °C, compared to the 2.9 °C increase that would arise from business-as-usual. In the most optimistic scenario, if the countries also fulfill the pledges that are not part of the Paris Agreement, temperatures will rise by 2.0 °C.

Biden's administration also launched a number of coalitions and initiatives aimed at stopping climate change and helping to reduce its impacts. These include a Global Climate Ambition Initiative for helping low-income countries to achieve emissions targets and a "Net-Zero Producers Forum, with Canada, Norway, Qatar, and Saudi Arabia, together representing 40% of global oil and gas production"

United Nations climate summit

In November 2021, world leaders met at the 2021 United Nations Climate Change Conference (COP26) to negotiate goals to reduce global warming. While there was some progress, it is believed that the agreements reached are not sufficient to avoid the worst damage.

Developing countries, which have already faced hardships due to intense droughts and flooding, asked that developed countries, largely responsible for global warming, establish a fund to help them cope.  The more well-to-do nations, including the U.S., refused.

One of the successes of the conference was the US - China agreement on fighting climate change together. The framework includes commitments to:
 Working for achieving halt in temperature rise on 2 and preferably 1.5 degrees, global Carbon neutrality.
 Establishing environmental standards and policies needed for the transition to clean economy.
 Moving toward Circular economy.
 Control and reduce Methane emissions. China will adopt a national methane reduction plan as the U.S. has already done. In the first half of 2022 both countries will convene a meeting to accelerate the process.
 Increase Energy efficiency and usage of Renewable energy. The U.S. will make its electricity sector, carbon pollution-free by 2035.
 Working to stop globally the use of unabated thermal coal power generation. China will lower the use of coal how much it can during the 15th Five Year Plan.
 Working to stop illegal deforestation by stopping illegal imports.
 Giving financial and capacity building help to other countries.
 Submitting new NDC to the year 2035 by 2025.
 Create a special body: ""Working Group on Enhancing Climate Action in the 2020s," that will coordinate the implementation of this agreement.

At the conference, 40 countries, including the U.S. and five institutions promised to stop financing carbon intensive projects abroad by the end of the year 2022.

At the conference US and UAE launched an initiative named "the Agriculture Innovation Mission for Climate (AIM for Climate)". In February 2022 the US gave 1 billion dollars to GHG emissions, cutting from its agricultural sector what can be considered as part of the implementation. The initiative needs another 8 billion dollars for being implemented as well.

Reception 
Environmental organizations and scientists responded positively to the Biden administration's actions on climate change on the first day of his presidency. The decisions taken one week later were similarly welcomed by environmental groups, like the Natural Resources Defense Council, the Sunrise Movement and partially by the Indigenous Environmental Network. However, the Western Energy Alliance filed a lawsuit against the decision to stop giving new permits for oil and gas drilling in federal lands and waters, whilst the Indigenous Environmental Network said that the decision did not go far enough. There is also concern that the ban on new oil and gas drilling on public lands will not reduce greenhouse gas emissions because less than half of the existing permits are presently in use.

Some have criticized Biden's environmental policies on the premise that they will eliminate jobs, a popular Republican argument against Biden in the 2020 election. Biden has countered that his policies will actually create jobs in the transition to a green economy. There is also the argument that climate change, if not acted upon, would cause the loss of many more jobs than any climate action on the part of the Biden Administration would. According to Energy Innovation, a program aimed at reaching zero emissions by 2050, could save the U.S. 3.5 trillion dollars if it starts being implemented now, compared to a scenario in which it will begin to be implemented in 2030.

The Biden administration's environmental policy has been characterized as a return to the Obama administration's climate change policy of reducing carbon emissions with the goal of conserving the environment for future generations. However, according to a letter sent to the administration by a group of young climate activists, returning to the policy of Obama and reaching carbon neutrality by 2050 will not be enough to stabilize the climate. Others have criticized Biden's environmental policies for being too conservative, believing that they do not go far enough in comparison to policies put in place by politicians like the Green Party's Howie Hawkins, who created the original version of the Green New Deal, or Biden's primary rival Bernie Sanders.

The attorney general of 21 Republican-led states sued Biden for canceling the permit to build the Keystone XL pipeline. The attorney general of 14 Republican-led states sued him for the moratorium on new oil and gas leases on public lands and waters. Many of those states suffer from severe, climate change induced, heat wave and drought. Farmers are among the most affected.

In February 2022 around 100 religious leaders called to Biden and congress to pass the build back better bill for protecting the climate. Those include Christians, Jews and others. Around 80% of catholic woman are members in the organizations that signed the letter. One of them mentioned that the bill sets a spending of 555 billion dollars through several years while the Senate approved spending of 770 billion in 1 year for military tasks.

References
Bundled references

2021 in the environment
Environmental policy in the United States
Policies of Joe Biden
Presidency of Joe Biden
Climate change